The hairy-faced bat (Myotis annectans) is a species of vesper bat.

It can be found in the following countries: India, Indonesia, Laos, Myanmar, and Thailand.

References

Mouse-eared bats
Bats of South Asia
Bats of Southeast Asia
Mammals of India
Mammals of Laos
Vertebrates of Myanmar
Mammals of Thailand
Mammals of Vietnam
Taxa named by George Edward Dobson
Mammals described in 1871
Taxonomy articles created by Polbot